Cheng Wei-hao (born 16 May 1984) is a Taiwanese film director and screenwriter.

Career
Born in Kaohsiung, Cheng enrolled at Fu Jen Catholic University and graduated with a bachelor's degree in Advertising and Public Relations. Following graduation, Cheng attended National Taiwan University of Arts, where he obtained a master's degree in film studies. Cheng's interest in filmmaking began in his junior high school period. In 2008, he won a Beijing Film Academy Outstanding Asian Student Film award and an award for Best New Director at the South Taiwan Film Festival for the short film, You Are Not Alone (2008). Then, he directed the crime thriller Real Sniper (2009), followed by the mockumentary, The Death of a Security Guard (2015), which won the Best Short Film at the 52nd Golden Horse Awards. Aside from directing shorts, Cheng also had work experience in the visual design sector.

In 2015, Cheng made his feature film debut with The Tag-Along, a horror film based on an urban legend about a mysterious young girl in red following a group of hikers; the young girl is believed to be a mountain ghost who curses people. The Tag-Along played at several festivals and received four nominations at the 53rd Golden Horse Awards. The film was a box office success, with earning NT$85 million to become the highest grossing Taiwanese horror film to date. In 2017, Cheng's second feature film was released, a suspense film about a series of mysteries revolving around a nine-year-old car accident, titled Who Killed Cock Robin.

Filmography

Songwriting credits

Awards and nominations

References

External links

 
 

1984 births
Living people
Fu Jen Catholic University alumni
Taiwanese film directors
Taiwanese screenwriters
Writers from Kaohsiung